Anklesvar INA is a town and an industrial notified area in Bharuch district  in the state of Gujarat, India.

Demographics
At the 2001 India census, Anklesvar INA had a population of 16,288 (males 54%, females 46%). Anklesvar INA had an average literacy rate of 78%, higher than the national average of 59.5%; with 55% of the males and 45% of females literate. 14% of the population was under 6 years of age.

References

Cities and towns in Bharuch district
Ankleshwar